The Toolamba–Echuca railway is a broad-gauge cross-country rail link between the towns of Toolamba and Echuca in Victoria, Australia. As a railway route to and from Echuca, it provides an alternative to the usual route via Bendigo. The line has not been used for passenger services since 1981, and goods movements on the line are intermittent, with it being booked out of service at times. The line was re-opened for goods traffic while there was track work on the Shepparton line between Seymour and Shepparton. On 3 October 2013 the line was re-opened after an upgrade.

History
The last passenger service from Echuca station along the Toolamba–Echuca line ran on 2 March 1981, consisting of Y class diesel locomotive Y161, hauling an ABE carriage and a C van. That consist had only been introduced a few months prior, with a DERM usually being rostered. Toolamba finally closed as a station on 20 December 1987.

During the Regional Fast Rail project, the line was used while work was being undertaken on the main line to Echuca via Bendigo. The line was also used by Freight Australia to send rice traffic from north of Echuca into Melbourne. On 3 October 2013 the line was re-instated for use by freight trains after an upgrade.

There have been plans for the line to be converted to standard gauge to provide standard gauge access to Echuca, but they have not yet eventuated.

References

Railway lines in Victoria (Australia)
Railway lines opened in 1880
5 ft 3 in gauge railways in Australia
1887 establishments in Australia